The National Hockey League (NHL) has undergone several rounds of expansion and other organizational changes during its history to reach its current thirty-two teams: twenty-five in the United States, and seven in Canada. The newest additions to the league are the Vegas Golden Knights in 2017 and the Seattle Kraken in 2021. The league has also relocated several franchises, most recently in 2011 when the former Atlanta Thrashers became the second and current incarnation of the Winnipeg Jets.

To gauge interest and help determine whether the NHL should entertain further expansion, the NHL Board of Governors accepted applications for new franchises during the 2015 offseason. Two potential ownership groups submitted applications for prospective teams in Las Vegas and Quebec City. The geographic distribution of teams between the NHL's two conferences was not a primary consideration for expansion, and the earliest time when a new franchise could start play was the 2017–18 season. On June 22, 2016, the NHL approved expansion to Las Vegas starting in the 2017–18 season with the Vegas Golden Knights, but deferred Quebec City's bid for a team. With the Quebec City bid still shelved by the league's board of directors, the league opened up another expansion window in December 2017, specifically to allow an ownership group from Seattle to place a bid; no other cities were allowed to submit bids in that window. The Seattle bid was approved on December 4, 2018, and the team began play in the 2021–22 season as the Seattle Kraken; commissioner Gary Bettman then stated the league would not expand any further for the foreseeable future, while deputy commissioner Bill Daly stated that the league may revisit expansion in the near future if it is deemed in the best interest of the league.

Expansion sites in Canada
The potential of adding additional franchises in Canada had been an ongoing source of controversy for the NHL in recent years as numerous groups proposed expanding the league into a new Canadian city, or purchasing a struggling American franchise and relocating it north; to a certain extent, these issues continue even after the Atlanta Thrashers relocated to Winnipeg, becoming the country's seventh active team. Quebec City and the Golden Horseshoe area of Southern Ontario are most frequently proposed as locations for new Canadian teams, as was Winnipeg prior to the announced relocation of the Thrashers.

Background

History of Canadian franchises (1967–present)
Throughout the history of the NHL, attempts to bring franchises to Canadian cities have caused points of contention. Among them, the league's existing Canadian teams, especially the Montreal Canadiens, historically have raised concerns about further dividing the NHL's Canadian television revenue.

Vancouver's rejected bid for one of six new franchises added in 1967 outraged Canadians, who felt they had been "sold out". Prime Minister Lester B. Pearson stated that "the NHL decision to expand only in the US impinges on the sacred principles of all Canadians."
Three years later, the Vancouver Canucks joined as the league's third Canadian franchise.

The 1979 defeat by a single vote of a merger agreement between the NHL and the rival World Hockey Association that would have resulted in three Canadian WHA franchises (the Edmonton Oilers, Quebec Nordiques, and Winnipeg Jets) joining the NHL led to a mass boycott of Molson products across Canada. In a second vote, the Montreal Canadiens, owned by Molson, reversed their position, allowing the Oilers, Nordiques (who were owned at the time by then-rival brewery Carling O'Keefe), and Jets to join the NHL for the 1979–80 NHL season (along with the New England Whalers, who would be renamed the Hartford Whalers). The Calgary Flames became Canada's seventh franchise in 1980, relocating from Atlanta.

There was considerable upheaval amongst Canadian franchises in the 1990s. In 1992, the NHL returned to Ottawa, beating out Hamilton for an expansion team. However, the declining value of the Canadian dollar at that time, coupled with rapidly escalating salaries, placed hardships on Canadian franchises. As a result, the Nordiques and Jets left Canada, becoming the Colorado Avalanche in 1995 and the Phoenix Coyotes in 1996 respectively. Fears persisted up to the 2004–05 NHL lockout that the Flames, Oilers, and Senators could follow suit. The financial fortunes of Canada's teams rebounded following the lockout: Canada's six franchises represented one-third of NHL revenues in 2006–07, primarily due to the surging value of the Canadian dollar.

In May 2011, True North Sports and Entertainment, an ownership group with the support of billionaire David Thomson, 3rd Baron Thomson of Fleet, purchased the Atlanta Thrashers and moved the team to Winnipeg, Manitoba. This was the first franchise relocation since 1997 and the first franchise to locate in Canada since the Ottawa Senators entered the league in 1992. At the 2011 NHL Entry Draft, it was announced that the team would be named the Jets.

Current views on Canadian expansion

Former National Hockey League Players Association executive director Paul Kelly has repeatedly argued in favor of bringing a new team to Canada. In early 2008, he described the Canadian market to The Palm Beach Post: "The six Canadian franchises do so well, they pack the buildings, get great TV, great revenue streams. If you put another team up there, be it in Nova Scotia or Hamilton, it would be more of the same." Prior to the relocation of the Atlanta Thrashers to Winnipeg, Prime Minister Stephen Harper spoke in favor of another team in Canada, stating he has spoken with NHL owners in the past about bringing a new team to southern Ontario.

A study published in April 2011 by the University of Toronto's Mowat Centre for Policy Innovation concluded that Canada can support 12 NHL teams, twice the number it had at the time of the study, including second franchises for Montreal, Toronto and Vancouver.

In May 2013, Nate Silver, editor of the polling and statistical analysis website FiveThirtyEight, concluded that there were about as many avid hockey fans in Canada as in the United States, despite the US having nine times Canada's population. He determined that among current NHL media markets, the average Canadian market had considerably more hockey fans than the typical US market, and that Canada could support 11 or 12 teams, with two additional franchises in the Golden Horseshoe, a second franchise in Montreal, and a team in Quebec City. Silver also believed Vancouver could support a second franchise, although he thought that some of the Vancouver-area hockey market could be drawn by a Seattle-based team.

Quebec City

Quebec City has been home to two NHL hockey teams. The first, the Quebec Bulldogs, were founded in 1878 and joined the NHL upon its founding in 1917. After 1920, they moved to Hamilton, Ontario. The second, the Quebec Nordiques, played from 1972 to 1979 in the World Hockey Association before joining the NHL as part of the NHL–WHA merger. In 1995, they moved to Denver to become the Colorado Avalanche. Part of the challenge for both the Bulldogs and Nordiques was that Quebec City was by far the smallest market in the NHL. According to the Television Bureau of Canada, a prospective Quebec City team would now be in the league's second-smallest market, ahead of only Winnipeg. However, Silver's analysis suggested that the Quebec City market was comparable to the US markets of Buffalo and Washington, D.C. in terms of avid hockey fans.

In October 2009, Quebec City mayor Regis Labeaume spoke with NHL commissioner Gary Bettman and former Nordiques owner Marcel Aubut regarding a new Nordiques team (no relation to the previous team of the same name). Bettman stated that Quebec City could be considered as a candidate for an NHL team provided it built a new arena and a team were for sale.

In May 2011, Labeaume stated that Pierre Karl Péladeau, president and CEO of Quebecor, was in talks with the NHL regarding a new Nordiques' team in Quebec City. He later became a politician for and leader of the Parti Québécois, a sovereignist political party in the province. In September 2012, Quebec premier Jean Charest (a member of the rival Liberal Party and whose government had invested in the new arena) claimed that the political aspect might hinder Quebec City's chances of getting a franchise, saying that Bettman might be less likely to allow a team to move if sovereignists were in power. According to Sports Illustrated, the league is wary of the Quebec sovereignty movement because of concerns that it could destabilize the Canadian dollar. However, Mayor Labeaume insisted that Péladeau's involvement in politics would not hinder either the management of the new arena or the negotiations over getting a franchise.
In March 2014, news broke that former Canadian prime minister and vice-chairman of Quebecor Brian Mulroney was also involved with negotiations. Labeaume pointed out that Mulroney and Bettman had negotiated directly for some time, and that "Mr. Bettman is a businessman. The Quebec sovereignty project will not bother him."

Prior to the 2011–12 NHL season, an exhibition game between the Montreal Canadiens and the Tampa Bay Lightning was played at the Colisée Pepsi, the former home of the Nordiques. The Canadiens were well received despite being from rival Montreal, and the designated away team of the game. Montreal was also scheduled to host the Carolina Hurricanes at the Colisée Pepsi in 2012; however, that game was canceled due to the 2012–13 NHL lockout. In September 2012, construction started on an 18,000-seat arena in Quebec City that would eventually become known as Centre Vidéotron, the cost of which (C$400 million) was split equally between the provincial and municipal governments. The arena opened on September 12, 2015.

On June 24, 2015, Quebecor announced that it planned to apply for an NHL expansion franchise, with the aim of bringing a Nordiques team back to Quebec City. Nearly a month later, on July 20, 2015, Quebecor formally announced it had submitted an application to the NHL for an expansion franchise. On July 21, 2015, the NHL confirmed it had received an application from Quebecor. On August 5, 2015, it was announced that Quebec City had moved on to Phase II of the expansion process. The bid subsequently advanced to Phase III, which ended on September 4.

Centre Vidéotron hosted a neutral-site preseason game between the Canadiens and the Pittsburgh Penguins on September 28, 2015. The following day in New York City, Quebecor and the Las Vegas ownership group presented their bids to the NHL's executive committee. However, NHL Commissioner Gary Bettman stated in a press conference after the NHL's Board of Governors meeting that though the league continued to explore the possibility of expansion, no deadline had been established for a decision. Commissioner Bettman also said that expansion requires a three-quarters affirmative vote from the Board of Governors, but the members of the executive committee would first have to make a recommendation to the group.

Quebec City's 2015 bid on an expansion team, while not entirely ruled out, was significantly weakened after the Canadian dollar declined in value against its US counterpart. , the Quebec City bid was said to be still being seriously considered, but not yet decided. Accepting the Las Vegas bid, the league ultimately decided to defer the Quebec City bid in 2016, citing the value of the Canadian dollar (78 cents to one US dollar when the deferment was announced) and the distribution of teams across the two conferences, which at the time placed 14 teams in the West and the other 16 in the East; the league was therefore more interested in adding teams to the West.

Centre Vidéotron was awarded some exhibition games leading into the 2016 World Cup of Hockey, an international tournament operated by the NHL, as well as a pair of NHL preseason games in successive years; on October 4, 2016, and September 18, 2017, between the Boston Bruins and Montreal Canadiens. In November 2021, Quebec Premier François Legault stated that he would meet with Commissioner Bettman in the coming months to "find out what we need to bring back the Nordiques".

Hamilton
Hamilton was a candidate for expansion in 1990, being one of the favorites, but lost out to the Ottawa Senators and Tampa Bay Lightning. Hamilton's bid group attempted to negotiate the $50 million expansion fee; a condition the NHL rejected. While it was speculated that the Toronto Maple Leafs and Buffalo Sabres did not want an NHL team in Hamilton due to territorial competition, former league president Gil Stein has denied that was the case.

BlackBerry founder and former co-CEO Jim Balsillie has made several attempts to purchase an existing NHL team with the purpose of bringing it to Southern Ontario. He signed an agreement in principle to purchase the Pittsburgh Penguins for US$175 million on October 5, 2006. Penguins' majority owner Mario Lemieux agreed to the sale after struggling to gain support from local governments to build a new arena. Balsillie's purchase agreement offered to help finance a new arena, but also contained a stated intention to relocate the team to Hamilton or Kitchener-Waterloo if no deal on a new arena could be reached. Balsillie later retracted his bid, claiming that the NHL had placed conditions on the sale that he was not comfortable with, including a commitment to keep the team in Pittsburgh under any circumstances.

Balsillie then reached an agreement to purchase the Nashville Predators for $238 million on May 24, 2007, and began a season ticket campaign in Hamilton a week later intending to prove that the city was capable of hosting an NHL team. Thousands of fans purchased tickets, however the sale again fell through a month later when Predators owner Craig Leipold terminated the agreement. The Predators were later sold to a group of ten investors, led by Nashville businessman David Freeman, who promised to keep the team in Nashville. Leipold accepted $40 million less from Freeman's group than Balsillie offered, and later ended up as the majority owner of the Minnesota Wild.

During the 2008–09 NHL season, the future of the Phoenix Coyotes was on shaky ground as the team expected to lose as much as $45 million, and the league had to step in to assist with paying the team's bills. Coyotes' managing partner Jerry Moyes filed for Chapter 11 bankruptcy protection in early May 2009. Immediately afterwards, an offer by Balsillie to purchase the team was made public. The NHL challenged the Coyotes' ability to file for bankruptcy, claiming that as a result of the financial support the league had been offering the franchise, the league itself is in control of the team, and that Moyes did not have authority to act as he did. Balsillie launched a public relations campaign aiming at igniting Canadian nationalistic feelings and the perception that Bettman had an anti-Canadian agenda, including a website. His bid to purchase the Coyotes failed as the bankruptcy judge ruled his offer did not meet the NHL's rules on relocation.

The Hamilton Spectator reported in May 2009, that a Vancouver-based group led by Tom Gaglardi was planning to make a bid to purchase the Atlanta Thrashers and relocate the team to Hamilton in time for the 2010–11 NHL season. This never materialized, and the idea was eventually rendered moot by the Thrashers' sale and relocation to Winnipeg. Gaglardi later purchased the Dallas Stars and kept the team in Dallas.

Roughly 15% of the Sabres' business comes from residents of the area of Ontario between Hamilton and Buffalo, and the Sabres or the Leafs could require "an enormous indemnification payment" to allow an additional team to be established within a 50-mile radius. An unnamed bidder made a bid for the Sabres in February 2011, offering $259 million for the team to move it out of Buffalo, which would either mean the team would relocate to Hamilton or it would clear the way for another team to make such a move. The bid was rejected in favor of an offer from Terry Pegula, who planned to keep the team in Buffalo.

Greater Toronto Area
Although Toronto is already home to the Toronto Maple Leafs and that team's AHL development team, the Toronto Marlies, its suburbs have been mentioned as potential sites for an NHL franchise, under the premise that the Greater Toronto Area, or GTA, is the most-populous metropolitan area in Canada and therefore could support two NHL teams. Unlike other potential expansion markets, a new arena would need to be constructed, and most of the proposals for a new Toronto area team include a new arena along with them.

In April 2009, a group of businesspeople met with NHL deputy commissioner Bill Daly to discuss the possibility of bringing a second NHL franchise into the Toronto area, most likely in Vaughan, Ontario. Despite the talks, Daly reportedly stated the NHL is "not currently considering expansion nor do we have any intention or desire to relocate an existing franchise."

In June 2009, a group headed by Andrew Lopez and Herbert Carnegie proposed a $1 billion plan for a second Toronto team, called the Legacy, to begin play no earlier than 2012. The group announced a plan for a 30,000-seat arena, half of which would be priced at C$50 or less. The arena would be situated in Downsview Park in the north of the city. Twenty-five percent of net profits would be given to charity.

In 2011, a proposal surfaced to build a multi-purpose 19,500-seat arena in Markham, Ontario, northeast of Toronto, that could be used for an NHL team. The C$300 million arena was proposed as part of a proposed entertainment complex. The company behind the proposal, GTA Sports and Entertainment, was headed by W. Graeme Roustan. Roustan, a Montreal-raised private equity investor whose firm Roustan Capital partnered with Kohlberg & Company and purchased Bauer from Nike, was also the chairman of Bauer. The proposed location for the arena was near the Unionville commuter train station on land owned by Rudy Bratty, chairman and CEO of Remington Group, an organization that is charged with the development of Markham's downtown. However, the GTA Sports and Entertainment Group did not file an application for expansion prior to the July 20, 2015 deadline in the most recent round of league expansion.

Saskatoon
Bill Hunter, the founder of the Edmonton Oilers, had an agreement to purchase the St. Louis Blues (then in a state of abandonment after its previous owner Ralston Purina walked away from the team) and move the team to Saskatoon as the Saskatoon Blues in the 1983–84 NHL season, with Don Cherry provisionally hired to be head coach; however, the NHL (which did not want to leave the St. Louis market) vetoed the sale. Faced with the prospects of either having to allow the sale or contract the franchise, the league found an owner (Harry Ornest) willing to keep the team in Missouri and, in an eleventh-hour deal, preserved the Blues in St. Louis, where they remain. Saskatoon again bid for a franchise during the league's early 1990s expansion, but the bid was considered a long-shot and was withdrawn before the league made its final decision.

A proposal from Ice Edge Holdings to purchase the Phoenix Coyotes would have moved a portion of the team's home games to Saskatoon in an effort to maintain the team's viability in its main home in Phoenix, similar to the former Bills Toronto Series arrangement in the National Football League; the group, had it bought the team, was ready to go forward and had leased Saskatoon's SaskTel Centre for five home games in the 2009–10 season. The group was believed to lack the funds to buy the team outright, but remained in contention as potential minority owner until May 2011, when it pulled out of negotiations. Some members of the Ice Edge group later joined the ownership group led by Canadian businessman George Gosbee who ultimately purchased the Coyotes and kept them in Arizona.

On Ice Management, an ownership group backed by auto racer, former Moncton Wildcats owner, and former professional hockey player John Graham, backed a long-shot bid to bring the NHL to Saskatoon. The Calgary Flames were scheduled to host the Ottawa Senators in Saskatoon, for a preseason game (sponsored by Graham) in September 2013; that game led to speculation that the city may host the Flames if the team's regular arena, Scotiabank Saddledome, which had been damaged in the 2013 Alberta floods, did not complete its repairs in time for the 2013–14 season. In the end, repairs were completed on a compressed schedule, and the Saddledome reopened in September 2013. Although neither Graham nor any other bidder representing Saskatoon placed a bid in the expansion window, the city again hosted a neutral-site preseason game in 2015.

Expansion sites in the United States
Several cities in the United States have been mentioned in the media as possible future sites for new or relocated NHL teams. In December 2007, organizations from Kansas City, Las Vegas, Houston, and Seattle presented their proposals for a franchise to the NHL's executive committee.

Houston

Greater Houston is the largest market in terms of both city proper and metro population in the US or Canada without an NHL franchise; since 2016, Houston is also now the largest metropolitan area without a complete set of teams in the major professional sports leagues. The area ranks second in the nation with 22 based Fortune 500 companies, only behind New York City, which has 45.

Professional ice hockey dates back to 1946 in Houston with the establishment of the Houston Skippers. This was followed by the Houston Apollos, the Houston Aeros of the WHA and the Houston Aeros of the AHL. The WHA Houston Aeros were an original member of the World Hockey Association. From 1972 to 1978, the Aeros twice won the AVCO World Trophy and featured the first father/son combination to play together in professional hockey, Gordie Howe and his two sons Mark and Marty. The Aeros, despite being a successful franchise, were left out of the NHL–WHA merger and were forced to fold in 1978. Another team also named the Aeros, of the American Hockey League (AHL), played at The Summit (renamed the Compaq Center in 1998 and converted to a megachurch after the Aeros' departure), and moved to the Toyota Center in 2003; the Aeros were unable to negotiate a lease extension, leading to the team's departure from Houston in 2013.

As part of the lease agreement between Toyota Center (which has NHL capacity, with 17,800 seats in its hockey configuration) and the Houston Rockets, only an NHL team owned by the owner of the Rockets is allowed to play at the center. The Rockets have twice explored the purchase of an NHL team for the building, with the closest being then-owner Les Alexander's attempt to purchase the Edmonton Oilers in 1998 which was thwarted when a local ownership group came together and matched his offer.

In 2017, the Toyota Center and Houston Rockets were purchased by Tilman Fertitta. In a press conference, Fertitta expressed his interest in bringing an NHL team to the Toyota Center and he had reportedly met with NHL commissioner Gary Bettman. Fertitta has stated his intentions of possibly finding a tenant that could help fill the building throughout the year, including the mention of attracting an NHL franchise.

Kansas City

Kansas City, Missouri has hosted NHL ice hockey before. The Kansas City Scouts played in Kemper Arena from 1974 until 1976. The team averaged only 8,218 in attendance per game in the 17,000-seat arena, leading to the team's sale and relocation to Denver to become the Colorado Rockies, who then relocated to East Rutherford, New Jersey (later Newark) in 1982 and became the New Jersey Devils.

Professional hockey continued at the arena in the form of the minor league Kansas City Blues, followed by the Kansas City Blades and the Kansas City Outlaws. The ECHL's Kansas City Mavericks currently play at the suburban Cable Dahmer Arena in Independence, Missouri.

Kansas City opened an NHL-ready arena named T-Mobile Center (originally the Sprint Center) in 2007. The arena is managed by the Anschutz Entertainment Group (AEG), which owns the Los Angeles Kings, among other sports interests. In 2007, when the Pittsburgh Penguins faced financial troubles and no prospect of a new arena, the president of AEG offered to relocate the team to Missouri to play in the then-new Sprint Center rent-free and become managing partners in the facility. The Penguins, however, remained in Pittsburgh and got their new arena in 2010.

Kansas City sports investor Lamar Hunt Jr., brother of Kansas City Chiefs CEO Clark Hunt and son of Chiefs founder Lamar Hunt Sr., called the NHL's $500 million price tag for an expansion franchise "a ridiculously big fee," and said that he is not aware of anyone in Kansas City who will make a push for a team. Neither he nor Cliff Illig, co-owner of MLS's Sporting Kansas City, bid in the NHL most recent expansion window.

Expansion outside Canada and the United States
Speculation about NHL expansion to Europe took place as far back as the 1960s. David Molson, then-owner of the Montreal Canadiens, stated that he looked forward to a "world playoff" for the Stanley Cup. In 1969, Clarence Campbell, president of the NHL, was quoted as saying "It is conceivable that the Stanley Cup will be played for in Moscow in the not too distant future. When it does, the World Tournament as we know it will just disappear.... The game will continue to expand."

Although no European cities have been named in recent years, NHL deputy commissioner Bill Daly stated in 2008 that expansion into Europe was a possibility "within 10 years' time." In August 2010, the International Ice Hockey Federation president René Fasel stated that he would strongly oppose any expansion by the NHL into European markets. Time zone complications would also be an obstacle. 2008 was also the year that the Russian Superleague evolved into the Kontinental Hockey League, which is recognized as one of the world's premier professional leagues after the NHL and has grown to include several other European cities.

See also
 History of organizational changes in the NHL

References

Further reading

External links
 makeitseven.ca, Archived version of Jim Balsillie's attempt to bring the Coyotes to Hamilton

Ice hockey in Canada
Ice hockey in the United States